Erik Fredrik Christian Svensson (born 3 October 1990) is a Swedish television personality and presenter. He is the sidekick of David Lindgren in Melodifestivalen 2018 as "Fab Freddie". He has earlier been a television presenter for the Barnkanalen show Morgonshowen. In 2017, he presented the Barnkanalen kids show Random Mix.

Biography
Svensson studied IT-media at John Bauer gymnasiet in Kalmar, and then studied TV production at Gamleby folkhögskola. After finishing his education he moved to Stockholm and started working as production manager for guest and contestants for TV productions such as Körslaget, Let's Dance (both broadcast on TV4) and Paradise hotel (broadcast on TV3). He then worked as a runner during the filming of the TV shows Solsidan and Äkta Människor.  In 2013 Svensson won an award for "Best organizer" at the TV producers award gala Riagalan, for his work as an organizer for the audience on several TV productions.  He has also presented an award during the QX gay gala in 2018.

Svensson has appeared in several YouTube videos with other YouTubers and presented his own shows on Splay such as "Sminkduellen", "Försökskaninerna" and "Fomo".

In 2016, Svensson presented the Barnkanalen morning show Morgonshowen. In 2017 he presented the kids show Random Mix at Barnkanalen.

In 2016, Svensson acted as the "kids superhero" during the Världens barn-gala travelling around Sweden and collected money for Världens barn help organization. The gala was broadcast on SVT.

In 2017, he started the podcast Fabfreddie och helt vanliga Mia TV-podden, along with TVproducer Mia Berg, in which they tell about their experiences in the TV industry.

During Melodifestivalen 2018 he was a sidekick to presenter David Lindgren, as "Fab Freddie".

He participates as a celebrity dance in Let's Dance 2019, which is broadcast on TV4

References

External links 

Living people
1990 births
Swedish television hosts
People from Kalmar Municipality